The Islamic Centre Hamburg is one of the oldest mosques in Germany and Europe and is abbreviated IZH. Established in Hamburg, in northern Germany, in the late 1950s by a group of Iranian emigrants and business people.

It is also known as the Blaue Moschee (blue mosque).

Iranian theologians and politicians (including Ayatollah Beheshti, Ayatollah Mohammad Mojtahed Shabestari or Mohammad Khatami) have spent time (often years) at the IZH.

History
During a meeting at Atlantic Hotel (Hamburg) in 1953, a group of Iranian residents of Germany discussed the need to establish their own religious center. A letter was sent to the late Grand Ayatollah Seyyed Husayn Borujerdi asking him for help; Grand Ayatollah agreed with the plan and donated 100,000 Rials to the center. The construction began in 1960 and by 1965 it was completed. In the same year Ayatollah Mohammad Beheshti was appointed to lead the center.

During the 1970s the centre played a significant role in bringing about the political rising of Iranian students in the West against the Shah and ultimately contributed to the Iranian Revolution.

The HV considers IZH to work against the democratic societal order. The IZH has repeatedly protested the monitoring and unsuccessfully to avoid it.

In 2016, IZH members took part in an anti-Israel protest in Berlin where Israel was denounced as an "enemy of humanity" and "terrorist", which became part of the long-standing public debate on Islamic community organisations in Germany.

Directors
  Hojjatulislam Mohagheghi (1955–1965)
  Hojjatulislam Mohammad Beheshti (1965–1970)
  Hojjatulislam Mohammad Mojtahed Shabestari (1970–1978)
  Hojjatulislam Mohammad Khatami (1978–1980)
  Hojjatulislam Mohammad Reza Moghaddam (1980–1992)
 Hojjatulislam Mohammad Bagher Ansari (1992–1998)
  Hojjatulislam Reza Hosseini Nassab (1999–2003)
 Hojjatulislam Seyyed Abbas Hosseini Ghaemmaghami (2004–2009)
 Hojjatulislam Reza Ramezani Gilani (2009–2018)
Hojjatulislam Mohammad Hadi Mofatteh (August 2018–Present)

See also
 Islam in Germany
 List of mosques in Europe

References

External links

 Official website (in German)
 Official website (in English)
 A brief history, Hamburg Islamic Center.

Iranian organizations based in Germany
1965 establishments in West Germany
Buildings and structures in Hamburg-Nord
Mosques completed in 1965
Mosques in Hamburg
Mosque buildings with domes
Shia mosques
Shia Islam in Germany